Yagya Raj Sunuwar is a Nepalese politician and Communist Party member of the Nepal House of Representatives. He was elected from Okhaldhunga-1, Province No. 1. He defeated Nepali Congress leader Ram Hari Khatiwada with 5,253 votes.

References

Living people
Nepal MPs 2017–2022
Nepal Communist Party (NCP) politicians
Members of the 2nd Nepalese Constituent Assembly
Communist Party of Nepal (Unified Marxist–Leninist) politicians
1972 births